Sandgate Road is a major road in Brisbane, Queensland, Australia. It provides part of the road connection between Redcliffe and the Brisbane CBD. It is designated state route 26 throughout most of its length.

The road is divided for the majority of its route, ranging from 4 to 6 lanes. It also includes a tunneled section (the George Bridges Tunnel named after local pioneer George Bridges) underneath the town centre of Nundah. It also passes Centro Toombul at Nundah.

According to surveys by the RACQ, Sandgate Road is one of the states 10 most frustrating roads.

At Clayfield, the road crosses the Doomben-Pinkenba railway line via an overpass.

History

Early days
European settlement occurred along what is now Sandgate Road from as early as 1838 (see Nundah history for an example) but the first bridges over Breakfast Creek were often destroyed by floods. The first permanent bridge from Breakfast Creek Road was built in 1858, and the first permanent bridge on Bowen Bridge Road was in 1860.

Prior to the 1870s the road from Albion to Nundah ran to the west of the present route. It followed what is now Bonney Avenue to the area now occupied by the railway line near Eagle Junction railway station, crossing what is now Junction Road and proceeding along what is now Jackson Street to Kedron Brook. This route involved negotiating a track over low land subject to frequent flooding, in addition to crossing Kedron Brook itself, before proceeding along what is now Bage Street. It is possible to walk a close approximation of this route (see map) It is the shortest walking route for this journey.

For information on changes to the route of Sandgate Road through Nundah in the 1860s refer to Nundah growth.

The following timeline shows events that were pertinent to the development of Sandgate Road.

Recent changes
Before the construction of Stage 3 of the Inner City Bypass in 2002 the southern end of Sandgate Road was at the point where Breakfast Creek Road crosses Breakfast Creek. Prior to the construction of the Abbotsford Road Bridge in 1928 this was the only direct access to Sandgate Road from the Brisbane CBD.

Upgrades

Intersection upgrades
A project to upgrade the intersection with Cameron Street, at a cost of $1.336 million, was to start in August 2022.

A project to upgrade the intersection with Northgate Road, at a cost of $1.296 million, was to start in August 2022.

Major intersections
The entire road is in the Brisbane local government area.

See also

 Nundah Bypass Tunnel
 George Bridges
 List of road routes in Queensland

References

Roads in Brisbane
Nundah, Queensland
Virginia, Queensland